Noddy and the Birthday Party is a children's video game released only in Europe for the Game Boy Color in 2000. It was developed by Tiertex Design Studios and published by BBC Multimedia. The game is based on the character Noddy by Enid Blyton, as well as the fictional universe in which he resides. The focus of the plot and gameplay is the preparation of the character Big-Ears' upcoming birthday party. The game has received mixed to negative reviews from critics.

Gameplay and plot
In the game's plot, Big-Ears has an upcoming birthday party. Levels are selected on an overworld map, where Noddy drives his car to any of various locations in Toyland, the setting of the Noddy universe. In each level, the player must help Noddy find all of a series of seven items (which change throughout each level), which will be useful for the setup of the party. After each level is completed, the player gains sixpences, which add up to an amount of 36 by the end of the game, to contribute to funds for the birthday cake. There are a total of ten levels, eight of which are platformer levels, and two of which are autoscrolling minigames.

Reception
Noddy and the Birthday Party has received mixed to negative reviews from critics. GameFAQs gave the game a rating of 3.14 out of 5. Several YouTube video game critics have greatly criticized the game for its music, physics, level design, and graphics.

References

2000 video games
BBC Multimedia games
Children's educational video games
Europe-exclusive video games
Game Boy Color games
Game Boy Color-only games
Platform games
Single-player video games
Tiertex Design Studios games
Video games about birthdays
Video games developed in the United Kingdom